This is a list of towns and villages in County Meath, Ireland.

A
 Agher
 Ashbourne
 Athboy

B
 Ballivor
 Batterstown
 Bellewstown
 Bettystown

C
 Carlanstown
 Carnaross
 Clonard
 Clonee
 Curraha

D
 Donaghpatrick
 Donore
 Drogheda (southern environs)
 Drumconrath
 Drumone
 Drumree
 Duleek
 Dunboyne
 Dunshaughlin

E
 Enfield

G
 Gormanston

J
 Julianstown

K
 Kells
 Kilcloon
 Kildalkey
 Kilmainhamwood
 Kilmessan
 Kilskeer

L
 Laytown
 Longwood

M
 Mornington
 Mosney
 Moynalty

N
 Navan
 Nobber

O
 Oldcastle

R
 Ráth Cairn
 Rathmolyon
 Ratoath

S
 Skryne
 Slane
 Stackallan
 Stamullen
 Summerhill

T
 Trim

Y
 Yellow Furze

References

 
Towns and villages